Herbert P. Wasgatt (August 26, 1865 – December 21, 1934) was an American shoe manufacturer and politician who was the eleventh mayor of Everett, Massachusetts, and a member of the Massachusetts Governor's Council.

Early life
Wasgatt was born on August 26, 1865, in Boston.

Business career
In 1884, Wasgatt began manufacturing shoes. In 1892, he organized the Andrews-Wasgatt Company with Elmore Andrews. Five years later, they moved their factory to Everett.

Political career
From 1908 to 1909, Wasgatt was a member of the Everett Board of Aldermen. From January 2, 1911, to January 2, 1912, he was the city's mayor. From 1912 to 1917, he was a member of the Everett School Committee.

From 1915 to 1917, he represented the 4th District on the Massachusetts Governor's Council.

Wasgatt was later a member of the State Board of Conciliation and Arbitration and Associate Commissioner of Labor and Industries.

Death
Wasgatt died on December 21, 1934, in Boston. At the time of his death he was a resident of Newton, Massachusetts.

References

1865 births
1934 deaths
Businesspeople from Massachusetts
Massachusetts Republicans
Mayors of Everett, Massachusetts
Members of the Massachusetts Governor's Council
Politicians from Newton, Massachusetts